The Goodyear Blimp is any one of a fleet of airships (or dirigibles) operated by the Goodyear Tire and Rubber Company, used mainly for advertising purposes and capturing aerial views of live sporting events for television. The term blimp itself is defined as a —without any internal structure, the pressure of lifting gas within the airship envelope maintains the vessel's shape.

From the launch of the Pilgrim in 1925 to the retiring of the Spirit of Innovation in 2017, Goodyear generally owned and operated non-rigid airships in its global public relations fleet. In 2014, Goodyear began to replace its three U.S. non-rigid airships  (blimps) with three new semi-rigid airships, each of which have a rigid internal frame. Although technically incorrect, Goodyear continues to use "blimp" in reference to these new semi-rigid airships. Wingfoot One, the first such model in Goodyear's U.S. fleet, was christened on August 23, 2014, at the Wingfoot Lake Airship Hangar, near the company's headquarters in Akron, Ohio.

Airship fleet

In May 2011, Goodyear announced it was replacing its fleet of non-rigid airships with three semi-rigid airships built by Luftschiffbau Zeppelin.

Goodyear's U.S. fleet consists of three semi-rigid airships (model LZ N07-101):

 Wingfoot One (N1A), based in Pompano Beach Airpark  in Pompano Beach, Florida
 Wingfoot Two (N2A), based in Goodyear Blimp Base Airport  in Carson, California
 Wingfoot Three (N3A), based in Wingfoot Lake Airship Operations Balloonport  in Suffield, Ohio 

The new airships are 246 feet long, 52 feet longer than Goodyear's old model, the GZ-20. The Zeppelin NT model is also slimmer, has a top speed of 70 miles per hour (versus 50 for the blimp), and has a passenger gondola that seats 12 (compared to seven in the blimp). The gondola also contains a restroom. Both craft are outfitted with LED sign technology Goodyear calls "Eaglevision". This allows the aircraft to display bright, multi-colored, animated words and images.

Goodyear has also leased blimps operating in other parts of the world. These airships were built and operated by The Lightship Group of Orlando, Florida. In 2012, The Lightship Group was acquired (along with the American Blimp Corporation) by Van Wagner Communications LLC, and operated as the Van Wagner Airship Group until November 17, 2017, when it was purchased by Airsign Inc. They currently operate an airship for Goodyear in China.

Lifting agent
The Goodyear blimps are inflated with helium. The helium is maintained under low pressure, so small punctures do not pose serious consequences for the blimp. One inspection element of the blimps is to look into the envelope for pinpoints of light which are indicative of small holes.

Prior to the Zeppelin NT, the Goodyear blimps were non-rigid (meaning their shape is not maintained by a rigid internal structure) dirigibles (directable/steerable airships). Inside their exterior envelope, the blimps are fitted with air-filled ballonets. As the blimp ascends or descends, the internal ballonets expand or contract to compensate for density changes and to maintain uniform pressure in the envelope. The latest Goodyear airship, the Zeppelin NT, is a departure from this convention, as it is a semi-rigid airship that makes use of a truss inside the envelope to provide some of its strength.

Models

"GZ" stands for Goodyear–Zeppelin, stemming from the partnership Goodyear had with the German company when both were building airships together. However, these models came many years after this partnership had dissolved during the start of World War II. The GZ-1 was the USS Akron (ZRS-4), the U.S. Navy's fourth rigid airship used for several tests including as a flying "aircraft carrier".

GZ-19/19A: Introduced in 1959 with the Mayflower (N4A) and discontinued in 1978 after the Mayflower (N38A) was destroyed by a tornado. The design for this class is similar to the L class blimp built by Goodyear for the U.S. Navy.
GZ-20/20A: This class was introduced in 1969, with America (N10A) and Columbia (N3A) being the first two. The  Europa (N2A) followed in 1972 and was based in Italy, the first Goodyear blimp operated outside of the United States. These airships were larger than the GZ 19 blimps. Beginning in 2014, Goodyear began retiring the GZ-20 and replacing them with the Zeppelin NT. On February 23, 2014, Spirit of Goodyear was retired in Pompano Beach after the 2014 Daytona 500. On August 10, 2015, the California-based GZ-20, the Spirit of America, was decommissioned. The Spirit of Innovation, took over California operations in September 2015 until its retirement in March 2017 as the last remaining GZ-20. In fall of 2017, Wingfoot Two will be relocated to California.
GZ-22: The only airship in this class was the Spirit of Akron (N4A). Originally built in 1987 to show the U.S. Department of Defense that airships were still militarily viable, it was the most technically advanced airship Goodyear ever had in its public relations fleet, featuring fly-by-wire technology. However, Spirit of Akron was destroyed in a crash in 1999 and the company has not built one since, most likely because of the increase in manufacturing and operating expenses due to its advanced technology.
LZ N07-101: In May 2011, Goodyear announced that it would be replacing its aging fleet of GZ-20 blimps (non-rigid airships) with Zeppelin NT airships. Construction began in 2012 on the first of three new semi-rigid airships; completed in March 2014, Wingfoot One was christened on August 23, 2014, by Good Morning America anchor Robin Roberts.  Wingfoot Two, the name of Goodyear's second semi-rigid airship, was unveiled in April 2016. The third finished the fleet in 2018. Shaesta Waiz, the youngest woman to fly solo around the world, christened Wingfoot Three during an August 30 ceremony in Akron, with the traditional smashing of a bottle of champagne across the bow. "Wingfoot Three will serve as a beacon for me to continue my work inspiring and celebrating aviation with others," said Waiz. She joined a list of other famous Goodyear airship christeners, including Amelia Earhart and astronaut Sally Ride.

Historical navy classes
C class blimp 1918–1919
D class blimp 1920–1924
F class blimp/Type FB 1918–1923
Goodyear Type AD 1925–1931
G class blimp 1935–19?
H class blimp 1921–1923
J class blimp 1922–1940
K class blimp 1938–1959, WWII anti-submarine, post-war tests
K-1 1938–1940, pre-war experimental
L class blimp 1930s–1945, WWII
M class blimp 1944–1956
N class blimp 1950s–1962
Goodyear ZWG 1950s

Dimensions

That is, over four times as long and over twice as wide as the current Goodyear blimps.

Names

Since 1928, Goodyear had traditionally named its blimps after the U.S. winners of the America's Cup yacht race. This naming method is attributed to then-Goodyear CEO P. W. Litchfield, who viewed the airships as "aerial yachts". Although that practice deviated with the introduction of the Spirit of Akron in 1987, the tradition ended with the Florida-based Stars & Stripes in 2005.

In 2006, Goodyear began having the public participate in the naming of their airships; they dubbed this the "Name the Blimp" contest. Spirit of Innovation was the first airship to be named by the public.

The America's Cup winners' names:
Puritan,
Reliance,
Defender,
Volunteer, 
Resolute,
Vigilant,
Mayflower,
Ranger,
Rainbow,
Enterprise,
Columbia,
America,
Stars & Stripes.

Non-cup winners' names:
Pilgrim,
Neponset,
Spirit of Akron,
Spirit of Goodyear,
Eagle,
Spirit of America,
Spirit of Innovation,
Wingfoot One,
Wingfoot Two.

Foreign based blimps have been operated by The Lightship Group since the 1990s:
Europa,
Spirit of Europe,
Spirit of the South Pacific,
Spirit of the Americas,
Spirit of Safety,
Ventura,
Ling Hang Zhe (Navigator).

Passenger policy
The only passengers that Goodyear will allow on the blimps are corporate guests of the company and members of the press; it has been Goodyear's long-standing policy that no public rides are offered. However, for over 50 years, it had to offer limited public rides at its Miami, Florida, winter base on Watson Island as part of its land-lease deal with the city in order to operate from the island. That practice ended in 1979 when the base was moved to Opa-locka, Florida.

Sometimes Goodyear has a contest with the dealers of its tires. If a customer buys four new Goodyear tires, they are entered into a contest to take a flight in the blimp. The winner must go to the nearest blimp base to take their flight.

During the period in which Goodyear supplied tires for Indy cars, it was a tradition that the pole position winner at the Indianapolis 500 would get a ride in the blimp in the days leading up to the race.

During the period in which Goodyear was a corporate sponsor of the All American Soap Box Derby, the winners of the World Championship races held each July in Akron, OH were awarded a ride in the blimp. Typically these rides were given on the day following the annual race, but if weather prohibited the blimp from flying on that day, the champions were given an award letter from Goodyear. This letter was basically a lifetime ticket for one blimp ride to be taken whenever arrangements could be made between all parties involved.

The European Goodyear blimp is operated by Deutsche Zeppelin-Reederei, a commercial passenger flight operator, and the Goodyear Zeppelin NT is regularly used for public flights around Germany outside of sport seasons.

Night signs
For years, Goodyear has fitted its blimps with a night sign. From neon tubes, to incandescent lamps to LEDs, these signs have helped the company advertise its products and also deliver public service messages from various organizations such as local governments.

 Neon-O-Gram Originally called NeonGoodyear, was first fitted on Defender  in the 1930s. Neon tubes on the sides of the blimp which usually spelled out 'Goodyear'.
 10 Panel Incandescent Bulbs
 Skytacular: In the mid-1960s, the GZ-19 Mayflower (N4A) was fitted with over 3,000 incandescent lamps of red, yellow, blue and green on both sides that for the first time featured animation. Usually moving stick figures, ticker messages or colorful patterns. A small gas turbine had to be attached to the blimp's car in order to power the Skytacular night sign.
 Super Skytacular: Same technology as Skytacular, but with more than 7,000 lamps on both sides. Super Skytacular was fitted on the new longer GZ-20 blimps in 1969.
 EagleVision

Accidents
 Wingfoot Air Express, while transporting passengers from Chicago's Grant Park to the White City Amusement Park, caught fire then crashed through the skylight of the Illinois Trust & Savings Bank on July 21, 1919, killing one crewman, two passengers, and ten bank employees.
 Columbia, tail number N10A, was buzzed repeatedly by a radio-controlled model airplane when the blimp flew over a field used for R/C model flying; the R/C pilot then intentionally rammed his model airplane into the blimp, tearing a three-foot hole through the envelope. The blimp made a "hard landing" at a nearby airport. The R/C pilot, John William Moyer, was identified by other flyers at the field and was later arrested. The incident occurred on September 30, 1990.
 Spirit of Akron, tail number N4A, crashed on 28 October 1999, in Suffield, Ohio, when it suddenly entered an uncontrolled left turn and began descending. The pilot and technician on board received only minor injuries when the blimp struck trees. The National Transportation Safety Board report identified that improperly hardened metal splines on the control actuators sheared, causing loss of control.
 Stars and Stripes, tail number N1A, crashed on June 16, 2005, in Coral Springs, Florida, when it was caught in a strong thunderstorm that eventually pushed the aircraft into trees and powerlines. There were no injuries in the crash, although the pilot and passenger were trapped for a number of hours until the powerlines could be de-energized. The National Transportation Safety Board accident report claims the cause of the accident to be the pilot's "inadequate in-flight planning/decision which resulted in an in-flight encounter with weather (thunderstorm outflow), and downdrafts..."
 Spirit of Safety I (built by American Blimp Corporation), registered as G-TLEL and owned and operated by Lightship Europe Limited, (but operating in Goodyear livery), caught fire while on landing approach to the Reichelsheim Airport and crashed on June 12, 2011, near Reichelsheim, Hesse, Germany. The pilot, Michael Nerandzic, flew the airship low enough that passengers could jump to the ground, and all three did indeed leap to safety. Nerandzic then, while still able to maintain some control on the burning blimp, climbed away so that fire or wreckage would not hit the escapees; soon after, Nerandzic died in the blimp's fiery wreck.

Popular culture
In 1983, the city of Redondo Beach, California, near the blimp base airport in Carson, California, adopted resolution number 6252 recognizing the Goodyear Airship Columbia as the "Official Bird of Redondo Beach".

In January 2019, the College Football Hall of Fame inducted the Goodyear Blimp as its first-ever nonhuman inductee.

References

General and cited references

External links

 Official Website
 The Goodyear Blimp, Today and Yesterday: A complete guide to Goodyear's advertising blimps
 Goodyear upgrades from blimps to Zeppelins
 Poll: Should Goodyear Still Call Their New Zeppelin NT Airships 'Blimps'? 
 A blimp is a blimp. These aren't.
 Goodyear-Zeppelin airship dock collection, 1920–1959. Finding guide on the OAC.

Airships of the United States
Goodyear aircraft
Blimp